"Show Me Love" is a song by Swedish singer Tove Styrke. It was released as a single on 21 January 2022 through Sony Music as the second single from her fourth studio album, Hard (2022).

Background
"Show Me Love" was written by Tove Styrke, Sophia Somajo, and Elof Loelv. The song was released as a single on 21 January 2022 through Sony Music.

Music video
Oskar Gullstrand and Tove Berglund directed the accompanying music video for "Show Me Love".

Charts

References

External links

2022 songs
2022 singles
Tove Styrke songs
Songs written by Elof Loelv
Songs written by Sophia Somajo
Song recordings produced by Elof Loelv
Sony Music singles
Songs written by Tove Styrke